Ted Archer may refer to:

Nello Rossati (1942–2009), Italian director, sometimes credited as Ted Archer
Ted Archer (unionist), father of Shelley Archer
Ted Archer, character in The Age of Innocence (1993 film)

See also
Edward Archer (disambiguation)